The Avenue Murfreesboro is an open-air regional lifestyle shopping center in Murfreesboro, Tennessee, located  southeast of downtown Nashville. More than one hundred stores reside within the complex. The anchor stores are Michaels, David's Bridal, Petco, Off Broadway Shoes, Ulta Beauty, Best Buy, Dick's Sporting Goods, Bed Bath & Beyond, Belk, Havertys Furniture, Kirkland's, Cost Plus World Market, Barnes & Noble, and Old Navy.

This was a record price for an open-air, non-mall in Tennessee.

As of June 30, 2013, eighty-five percent of the space had been leased.

See also
 List of shopping malls in Tennessee

References

External links

Avenue Murfreesboro
Shopping malls established in 2007
Buildings and structures in Murfreesboro, Tennessee
Tourist attractions in Rutherford County, Tennessee